The Klosterbach is a right-hand tributary of the Große Aue, which is known as the Neuer Mühlenbach at the point where they join, in north Germany. The Klosterbach lies entirely within the parish of Rödinghausen in the district of Herford, North Rhine-Westphalia.

The Klosterbach descends a height of 58 metres.

See also 
 List of rivers in Ostwestfalen-Lippe

References 

Rivers of North Rhine-Westphalia
Rivers of Germany